Chandgaon Mosque is a mosque in Chittagong, Bangladesh, completed in 2007. Designed by Kashef Mahboob Chowdhury, it was shortlisted for the Aga Khan Award for Architecture in 2010.

See also
 List of mosques in Bangladesh

References

Mosques in Chittagong
Mosques completed in 2007